Gori Lake is a small fresh to brackish lake in the uplands of East Azarbaijan Province in north-western Iran. Together with the adjacent reed marshes it is an important breeding area for waterfowl. A 1.2 km² site was designated as a Ramsar Convention wetland protection site on 23 June 1975.

References

External links
 
 "Lake Gori" at World Database on Protected Areas (WDPA)

Lakes of Iran
Ramsar sites in Iran
Landforms of East Azerbaijan Province